Law of the Lash is a 1947 American Western film directed by Ray Taylor. The screenplay concerns a U.S. marshal who attempts to clean up a town that has been taken over by crooks. It was the first lead role of Lash LaRue who had previously appeared in three of PRC's Eddie Dean Cinecolor Westerns, and the first pairing of Lash with sidekick Al "Fuzzy" St. John.

Cast 
Lash LaRue as "Cheyenne" Davis
Al St. John as Fuzzy
Lee Roberts as Henchman "Lefty"
Mary Scott as Jane Hilton
Jack O'Shea as Gang Leader Decker, aka Dude Bracken
Charles King as Sheriff Rand
Carl Mathews as Henchman "Blackie"
Matty Roubert as Henchman "Peewee"
John Elliott as Dad Hilton
Slim Whitaker as Henchman Bart
Ted French as Henchman "Smitty"
Richard Cramer as Jake, the Bartender

External links 

1947 films
American black-and-white films
1947 Western (genre) films
Producers Releasing Corporation films
Films directed by Ray Taylor
American Western (genre) films
Films scored by Albert Glasser
1940s English-language films
1940s American films